A medical corps is generally a military branch or officer corps responsible for medical care for serving military personnel. Such officers are typically military physicians.

List of medical corps
The following organizations are examples of medical corps:

In the British Armed Forces and Commonwealth of Nations:
 Royal Army Medical Corps, a specialist corps of the Army Medical Services that provides medical care to British Army personnel
 Royal Australian Army Medical Corps, the branch of the Australian Army responsible for providing medical care to Army personnel
 Royal New Zealand Army Medical Corps, a corps of the New Zealand Army that is responsible for medical care to Army personnel
 Sri Lanka Army Medical Corps, a corps of the Sri Lanka Army that is responsible for medical care to Army personnel

In the United States military:
 Medical Corps (United States Army), a corps that consists of all physicians of the U.S. Army Medical Department
 Medical Corps (United States Navy), a staff corps of the United States Navy consisting of doctors in a variety of specialties
 United States Air Force Medical Service, a corps that consists of all physicians of the U.S. Air Force Medical Service

In the Indian Armed Forces
 AFMS(Armed Forces Medical Services), known as Army Medical Corps that is responsible for medical care to Indian Armed Forces(Army, Navy, Air Force, Coast Guard) personnel. It is tri-service organization. It provides medical support to the Armed Forces during war as well as comprehensive health care to all service personnel, ex-servicemen and their dependents during peace. Army Medical Corps provides medical aid during natural calamities both at national and international levels. AFMS has a common pool which allows officers to migrate from one service to another depending on the requirement.

In the French Armed Forces:
 Defence Health Service

In the Irish Defence Forces:
 Medical Corps (Ireland)

In the Israel Defense Forces:
 Medical Corps (Israel)

In the Myanmar Armed Forces:
 Myanmar Army Medical Corps

In the Bangladesh Armed Forces:
 Army Medical Corps (Bangladesh)

In the Polish Armed Forces:
 Military Health Service, part of the Polish Armed Forces providing a comprehensive full-scale military health service to them

In the Singapore Armed Forces:
SAF Medical Corps, a tri-service organization part of the Singapore Armed Forces that provides medical support for the Singapore Army, Navy and Air Force.

In the South African National Defence Force:
 South African Military Health Service, a distinct Arm of Service (as opposed to Army, Navy or Air Force), providing a comprehensive full-scale military health service to the South African National Defence Force

In the Armed Forces of the Russian Federation:
 Main Military Medical Directorate

In the German Armed Forces (Bundeswehr):
 Zentraler Sanitätsdienst

Dental corps
A dental corps is a specialist military unit, generally including dentists and dedicated to maintaining the dental health of service personnel. Dental corps are therefore a kind of medical corps, and are typically either within the medical corps of their military organization, or closely associated with it.

List of dental corps
 Royal Army Dental Corps, a specialist corps of the British Army Medical Services
 Royal Australian Army Dental Corps
 Royal Canadian Dental Corps
 Royal New Zealand Army Dental Corps
 United States Army Dental Corps, a special branch of the Army Medical Department (United States)
 United States Navy Dental Corps
 Army Dental Corps (India)
 Army Dental Corps (Pakistan)
 Army Dental Corps (Bangladesh)

See also
Medical Reserve Corps, a civilian program in the United States
International Medical Corps (IMC), a global humanitarian nonprofit organization
Medical Cadet Corps, a Seventh-day Adventist organization

+Medical corps
+Medical